Swordthrust is an adventure for fantasy role-playing games published by Mayfair Games in 1984.

Plot summary
Swordthrust is a scenario for character levels 3-7.  The book described a mountain village, a dwarven cavern, and a five-level ice dungeon hollowed out inside the head of a vast sleeping Ice Titan.

In Swordthrust, the player characters are on a quest to find the legendary Ice Titan hidden high in the snowy Chatar Mountains.  The bulk of the adventure involves the exploration of a five-level "dungeon" is actually the interior of the slumbering Titan's brain.  While the Titan sleeps, the forces of good and evil (represented by the bird-like Fancies and lizard men called Durges) battle for domination of his mind.  Other encounters are provided by the Titan's memories – physical manifestations of anything and everything the titan has experienced in his lifetime.  The player characters can also search for hidden pieces of magic armor scattered throughout the Titan's mind.

Publication history
Swordthrust was written by Sam Shirley and Daniel Greenberg, with a cover by Janny Wurts, and was published by Mayfair Games in 1984 as a 40-page book. The adventure module was part of the Role Aids line and was suitable for Dungeons & Dragons or similar systems.

Reception
Rick Swan reviewed the adventure in The Space Gamer No. 72. He commented that "Swordthrust is a solid example" of how modules in the Role Aids line have been designed with Dungeons & Dragons specifically in mind: "With a minimum of tinkering, it can be played smoothly on its own or can be dropped nearly into just about any ongoing campaign." He added: "With a setting as imaginative as this, just about anything is possible and for the most part, the designers rise to the occasion.  The 'memories' provide some of the most bizarre encounters you're ever likely to run across. [...] Knowing that literally anything can happen keeps player interest high.  He continued: "Swordthrust could have been a classic ... if just a little more effort had gone into a final polish.  Given the nearly limitless possibilities of the premise, too many of the encounters are distressingly run-of-the-mill. [...] The first half of the module rambles quite a bit; a good editor could have easily cut it in half.  One more draft could have taken care of most of this."  Swan concluded his review by saying: "All in all, though, Swordthrust is a very respectable effort.  It's generally well-presented, original in approach, and quite playable.  Those seeking an alternative to TSR-produced modules would do well to investigate RoleAids, and Swordthrust is a good place to start."

References

Fantasy role-playing game adventures
Role Aids
Role-playing game supplements introduced in 1984